Eagle catching Fish or Eagle catching Ichthys (German: Adler fängt Fisch or Adler fängt Ichthys) is a German anti-Christian and neo-pagan symbol.

It depicts an Eagle catching an Ichthys, a fish symbol associated with Christianity. The symbol is supposed to represent pagan strength and victory over Christianity. The symbol was first created in 1989, and later registered as a trademark in 2003 by Holocaust denier Jürgen Rieger for the far-right German neo-pagan organisation Artgemeinschaft Germanische Glaubens-Gemeinschaft.

Another anti-Christian symbol known as "Odins Raben" ( Odins Ravens) similarly depicts two ravens attacking an Ichthys.

While the symbol originated from, and also mostly associated with, far-right pagan circles, this association is not always the case.

Usage 
The design of the symbol can often vary.

A variant of the symbol was used on a hoodie named "No Inquisition" produced by the clothing brand Thor Steinar, which is popular among the far-right in Germany. Some German pagan metal bands, such as XIV Dark Centuries,[de] also have previously used the symbol.

Assessments 
The Evangelical Association of Saxony and the Office for Worldview and Sect Issues of the Evangelical-Lutheran Church of Saxony recognizes the symbol as clearly anti-Christian symbolism. It did not, however, conclude an inherent and clear association to the far-right extremist scene.

See also 

 Artgemeinschaft
Esoteric Nazism
 Modern Paganism
 Christian Blasphemy
 Anti-Christian sentiment
 Variations of the ichthys symbol

References 

Religious symbols
Anti-Christian sentiment in Europe
Modern paganism in Germany
Far-right politics in Germany
1980s in modern paganism